CNN Heroes: An All-Star Tribute is a television special created by CNN to honor individuals who make extraordinary contributions to humanitarian aid and make a difference in their communities. The program was started in 2007. Since 2016, the program was hosted by Anderson Cooper and Kelly Ripa. Honorees are introduced during the fall of each year and the audience is encouraged to vote online for the CNN Hero of the Year.  Ten recipients are honored and each receive US$10,000. The top recipient is chosen as the CNN Hero of the Year and receives an additional US$100,000 to continue their work. During the broadcast celebrating their achievements, the honorees are introduced by celebrities who actively support their charity work. To celebrate the 10th anniversary, the 2016 edition had an additional segment where five previous Hero of the Year winners were chosen as candidates for the Superhero of the Year award, which was decided with an online poll.

Heroes

2007 

The 18 CNN Heroes finalists for 2007 were (in alphabetical order):

 Florence Cassassuce, La Paz, Mexico
 Kayla Cornale, of Burlington, Ontario, Canada
 Mathias Craig, of San Francisco
 Irania Martinez Garcia, of Guantanamo, Cuba
 Pablo Fajardo, of Ecuador
 Rangina Hamidi, of Stone Ridge, Virginia, United States
 Rick Hodes, of Addis Ababa, Ethiopia
 Lynwood Hughes, of Rocky Mount, North Carolina, United States
 Dallas Jessup, of Vancouver, Washington, United States
 Peter Kithene, of Seattle, Washington, United States
 Scott Loeff, of Chicago, Illinois, United States
 Mark Maksimowicz, of St. Petersburg, Florida, United States
 James McDowell, of Patchogue, New York, United States
 Anne McGee, of Las Vegas, Nevada, United States
 Josh Miller, of Santa Monica, California, United States
 Rosemary Nyirumbe, of Uganda
 Steve Peifer, of Kijabe, Kenya
 S. Ramakrishnan, of Ayikydy, India
 Julie Rems-Smario, of Oakland, California, United States
 Scott Southworth, of USA

2008 

The Top 10 CNN Heroes of 2008 were (in alphabetical order):

 Tad Agoglia, of Long Island, New York, United States
 Yohannes Gebregeorgis, of Addis Ababa, Ethiopia
Carolyn LeCroy, of Norfolk, Virginia, United States
 Anne Mahlum, of Philadelphia, Pennsylvania, United States
 Liz McCartney, of St. Bernard Parish, Louisiana, United States: CNN 2008 Hero of the Year
 Phymean Noun, of Toronto, Ontario, Canada
 David Puckett, of Savannah, Georgia, United States
 Maria Ruiz, of El Paso, Texas, United States
 Marie Da Silva, of (Malawi), residing in Los Angeles, California, United States
 Viola Vaughn, of Kaolack, Senegal

2009 

The Top 10 CNN Heroes of 2009 were (in alphabetical order):

 Jorge Munoz, of Queens, New York, United States
 Jordan Thomas, of Chattanooga, Tennessee, United 
 Budi Soehardi, of Kupang, Indonesia
 Betty Makoni, of London, United Kingdom
 Doc Hendley, of Blowing Rock, North Carolina, United States
 Efren Peñaflorida, of Cavite City, Philippines: 2009 CNN Hero of the Year
 Derrick Tabb, of New Orleans, Louisiana, United States
 Roy Foster, of Palm Beach, Florida, United States
 Andrea Ivory, of West Park, Florida, United States
 Brad Blauser, of Dallas, Texas, United States

2010 

The top 10 CNN Heroes of 2010 (in alphabetical order):

 Guadalupe Arizpe De La Vega of  Juarez, Mexico
 Susan Burton of California, United States
 Linda Fondren of Mississippi, United States
 Anuradha Koirala of Kathmandu, Nepal: 2010 CNN Hero of the year
 Narayanan Krishnan of Madurai, India
 Magnus MacFarlane-Barrow of Scotland, United Kingdom
 Harmon Parker of Kenya, Africa
 Aki Ra of Cambodia
 Evans Wadongo of Kenya, Africa
 Dan Wallrath of Texas, United States

Also all of the 33 Chilean Miners came on the show to be honored after the 2010 Copiapó mining accident before awards were given out to the list of heroes shown above. Kareem Taylor is the promotional voice for the commercial campaign leading up to the show.

2011 

The top 10 CNN Heroes of 2011 (in alphabetical order):

 Eddie Canales of  Texas, United States
 Taryn Davis of North Carolina, United States
 Sal Dimiceli of Wisconsin, United States
 Derreck Kayongo of Atlanta, United States
 Diane Latiker of Chicago, United States
 Robin Lim of Bali, Indonesia: 2011 CNN Hero of the year
 Patrice Millet of Haiti
 Bruno Serato of Anaheim, California, United States
 Richard St. Denis of Mexico
 Amy Stokes of South Africa

2012 

The top 10 CNN Heroes of 2012 (in alphabetical order):

 Pushpa Basnet of Kathmandu, Nepal: 2012 CNN Hero of the year
 Wanda Butts of Ohio, United States
 Mary Cortani of California, United States
 Catalina Escobar of Cartagena, Colombia
 Razia Jan of Afghanistan, with an organization located in Massachusetts, United States
 Thulani Madondo of Kliptown, South Africa
 Leo McCarthy of Montana, United States
 Connie Siskowski of New Jersey, United States
 Scott Strode of Colorado, United States
 Malya Villard-Appolon of Kofaviv, Haiti

The 3 Young Wonders of 2012 (in alphabetical order):
 Cassandra Lin
 Will Lourcey 
 Jessica Rees

2013 
The top 10 CNN Heroes of 2013 (in alphabetical order):

 Dale Beatty, co-founder of Purple Heart Homes
 George Bwelle
 Robin Emmons
 Danielle Gletow, founder of One Simple Wish
 Tawanda Jones
 Richard Nares
 Kakenya Ntaiya
 Chad Pregracke of the USA: 2013 CNN Hero of the year
 Estella Pyfrom, creator of "Estalla's Brilliant Bus"
 Laura Stachel

2014 

The top 10 CNN Heroes of 2014 (in alphabetical order):

 Arthur Bloom of the United States
 Jon Burns of the United Kingdom
 Pen Farthing of the United Kingdom: 2014 CNN Hero of the year
 Elimelech Goldberg of the United States
 Leela Hazzah of Kenya
 Patricia Kelly of the United States
Annette March-Grier of the United States
 Ned Norton of the United States
 Juan Pablo Romero Fuentes of Guatemala
Dr. Wendy Ross of the United States

The 3 Young Wonders of 2014 (in alphabetical order):
 Lily Born
 Maria Keller, Read Indeed, 
 Joshua Williams, Joshua's Heart

2015 
The top 10 CNN Heroes of 2015:

Maggie Doyne, of New Jersey, United States: 2015 CNN Hero of the year
Jim Withers, United States
Monique Pool, of Suriname
Richard Joyner, United States
Sean Gobin, United States
Bhagwati Agrawal, India
Kim Carter, United States
Rochelle Ripley, United States
Jody Farley-Berens
Daniel Ivankovich, United States

2016 
The top 10 CNN Heroes of 2016:

Jeison Aristizábal of Cali, Colombia: 2016 CNN Hero of the year
Craig Dodson, United States
Sherri Franklin, United States
Brad Ludden, United States
Luma Mufleh, United States
Georgie Smith, United States
Umra Omar, Kenya
Sheldon Smith, United States
Becca Stevens, United States
Harry Swimmer, United States
Pushpa Basnet, of Kathmandu, Nepal: 10th Anniversary CNN SuperHero

2017 
The top 10 CNN Heroes of 2017:

Stan Hays
Samir Lakhani
Jennifer Maddox
Rosie Mashale
Andrew Manzi
Leslie Morissette
Mona Patel
Khali Sweeney
Aaron Valencia
Amy Wright: 2017 CNN Hero of the year

2018 
The top 10 CNN Heroes of 2018:

Abisoye Ajayi-Akinfolarin
Maria Rose Belding
Amanda Boxtel
Rob Gore
Luke Mickelson
Susan Munsey
Florence Phillips
Ricardo Pun-Chong: 2018 CNN Hero of the Year
Ellen Stackable
Chris Stout

2019 
The top 10 CNN Heroes of 2019 each received US$10,000. The 2019 CNN Hero of the Year received an additional US$100,000. The top 10 CNN Heroes of 2019:

Staci Alonso, Noah's Animal House (pet shelter for escaping domestic violence)
Najah Bazzy, Zaman International (helping women & children living in poverty)
Woody Faircloth, RV4CampfireFamily.org
Freweini Mebrahtu, 2019 CNN Hero of the Year, Dignity Period (helping Ethiopian girls stay in school)
Mark Meyers
Richard Miles
Roger Montoya
Mary Robinson
Afroz Shah
Zach Wigal

The 4 Young Wonders of 2019 (in alphabetical order):
 Jemima Browning, Tadcaster Stingrays
 Grace Callwood, We Cancerve Movement
 Bradley Ferguson, Post Crashers
 Jahkil Jackson, Project I Am

2020 
The 14th Annual CNN Heroes: An All-Star Tribute focused solely on inspirational heroes from the biggest stories of the year -- the fight against coronavirus and the battle for racial equity and social justice. Frontline workers, advocates, scientists, Young Wonders and everyday people were saluted and 8 nonprofit organizations working to tackle these issues were highlighted.  Each organization received $10,000 and viewers were encouraged to donate to these vetted, trusted organizations.  

In lieu of the traditional Top 10 and CNN Hero of the Year, the 2020 edition saw viewers selecting the year's Most Inspirational Moments. 

The nonprofit organizations highlighted included:

AdoptAClassroom.org
Bring Change To Mind
Center for Disaster Philanthropy
Equal Justice Initiative
IssueVoter
Make-A-Wish America
Water.org
World Central Kitchen

The 3 Young Wonders of 2020 (in alphabetical order):

Cavanaugh Bell, Cool & Dope
Tiana Day, Youth Advocates for Change
TJ Kim, Operation SOS

2021 
The 15th Annual CNN Heroes All-Star Tribute returned to the long-running shows' traditional format honoring the Top 10 CNN Heroes of 2021 with viewers voting online for the CNN Hero of the Year.  Shirley Raines was selected as the 2021 CNN Hero of the Year.

Honorees included:

Jennifer Colpas, Colombia - Tierra Grata

Lynda Doughty, United States - Marine Mammals of Maine

David Flink, United States - Eye To Eye

Dr. Patricia Gordon, United States - Cure Cervical Cancer 

Hector Guadalupe, United States - A Second U Foundation

Michele Neff Hernandez, United States - Soaring Spirits

Zannah Mustapha, Nigeria - Future Prowess Islamic Foundation

Shirley Raines, United States - Beauty 2 The Streetz

Made Janur Yasa, Indonesia - Plastic Exchange

Young Wonders recognized included:

Chelsea Phaire, United States - Chelsea's Charity

Jordan Mittler, United States - Mittler Senior Technology

2022 
The 16th Annual CNN Heroes: An All-Star Tribute premiered live on Sunday December 11th, 2022.  Nelly Cheboi was selected by viewers as the 2022 CNN Hero of the Year.

Honorees included:

Carie Broeker - Pacific Grove, CA   

Richard Casper - Nashville, TN

Nelly Cheboi - Mogotio, Kenya and Shabbona, IL

Nora El-Khouri Spencer - Carrboro, NC

Tyrique Glasgow - Philadelphia, PA

Teresa Gray - Anchorage, AK

Meymuna Hussein-Cattan - Santa Ana, CA

Aidan Reilly - Santa Ana, CA

Debra Vines - Maywood, IL

Bobby Wilson - Atlanta, GA

Young Wonders recognized included:

Ruby Chitsey - Harrison, AR

Sri Nihal Tammana - Edison, NJ

Awards 
In 2022, the program was honored with the News & Documentary Emmy Award for Outstanding Live News Special for its 2021 15th Annual Show.  The program's director Brett Kelly was also nominated for Outstanding Direction and the original full-length CNN Heroes segment on Shirley Raines of Beauty 2 The Streetz was nominated for Outstanding Soft Feature Story: Short Form. 

In 2020, the program's director, Brett Kelly, received the inaugural Outstanding Direction News & Documentary Emmy Award for its 2019 13th Annual Show.  In 2019, the program was nominated for the News & Documentary Emmy Award for Outstanding News Special for its 2018 12th Annual show. 

In 2017, the program received a News & Documentary Emmy Award for Outstanding Lighting Direction and Scenic Design its 2016 10th Annual show.
In 2012, the program received a Peabody Award for its 2011 campaign and show. CNN Heroes has also been nominated for additional News & Documentary Emmy Awards and is the winner of 3 Gracies and multiple National Association of Black Journalists Salute to Excellence Awards.

See also 
 List of awards for volunteerism and community service

References

External links 
 Official CNN Heroes website
 
 
 
 
 
 
 
 
 
 
 
 
 
 
 
 

CNN
American annual television specials